The 2007 Columbus Crew season was the club's twelfth season of existence, and their twelfth consecutive season in Major League Soccer, the top flight of American soccer. Columbus also competed in the U.S. Open Cup but failed to qualify for the MLS Cup Playoffs. The season covered the period from November 9, 2006 to the start of the 2008.

Although the Crew faced FC Dallas in the regular season, control of the inaugural edition of the Lamar Hunt Pioneer Cup was decided in the preseason. Columbus claimed a 3–0 victory and hoisted the cup for the first time. The Crew were eliminated in the U.S. Open Cup qualification semifinals by Los Angeles Galaxy and finished three points out of a spot in the MLS Cup Playoffs, the third consecutive season without a playoff berth for Columbus.

Background
In the 2006 season the Crew finished sixth place in the East, finished last in the Supporters' Shield table, and failed to qualify for the U.S. Open Cup or the CONCACAF Champions' Cup. Columbus lost defender Ritchie Kotschau to expansion team Toronto FC, but he would be replaced by 2007 MLS SuperDraft second-round selection Brad Evans. Coach Sigi Schmid would also bring in Danny O'Rourke, Robbie Rogers, Alejandro Moreno, William Hesmer, and the team's very first Designated Player, Guillermo Barros Schelotto.

The 2007 season was ultimately unsuccessful, but would be a rebuilding year for Columbus in preparation for the 2008 season, in which they would win both the Supporters' Shield and MLS Cup.

Roster

Non-competitive

Competitive

MLS

Standings

Eastern Conference

 – Toronto FC cannot qualify for the U.S. Open Cup, as it is a Canadian-based team.If they had qualified for an automatic berth into the U.S. Open Cup, the next highest placed team in the Eastern Conference not already qualified would have qualified.

Overall table

Results summary

Results by round

Match results

U.S. Open Cup

Statistics

Appearances and goals

Disciplinary record

Clean sheets

Awards
Sources:

MLS Player of the Week

MLS Player of the Month

2007 MLS All-Star Game
 FW Guillermo Barros Schelotto
 MF Frankie Hejduk

Postseason
MLS Best XI
 MF Guillermo Barros Schelotto

Columbus Crew Team Awards
 Most Valuable Player – Guillermo Barros Schelotto
 Golden Boot – Alejandro Moreno
 Defender of the Year – Frankie Hejduk
 Breakthrough Performance of the Year – Guillermo Barros Schelotto
 Humanitarian of the Year – Danny O'Rourke
 Comeback Player of the Year – Frankie Hejduk
 Hardest Working Man of the Year – Alejandro Moreno

See also
 Columbus Crew
 2007 in American soccer
 2007 Major League Soccer season

References

Notes

Columbus Crew seasons
Columbus Crew
Columbus Crew
Columbus Crew